Gdańsk Osowa railway station is a railway station serving the Osowa district of Gdańsk, in the Pomeranian Voivodeship, Poland. The station opened in 1930 and is located on the Nowa Wieś Wielka–Gdynia Port railway, Gdańsk Kokoszki–Gdańsk Osowa railway and Gdańsk Wrzeszcz–Gdańsk Osowa railway. The train services are operated by SKM Tricity.

Modernisation
Between 2014 and 2015 the station was modernised as part of the works for the Pomorska Kolej Metropolitalna.

Train services
The station is served by the following services:

Pomorska Kolej Metropolitalna services (R) Gdynia Główna — Gdańsk Osowa — Gdańsk Port Lotniczy (Airport) — Gdańsk Wrzeszcz
Pomorska Kolej Metropolitalna services (R) Kościerzyna — Gdańsk Osowa — Gdynia Główna

References

 This article is based upon a translation of the Polish language version as of July 2016.

External links

Osowa
Railway stations in Poland opened in 1930